The canton of Saint-Pons-de-Thomières is an administrative division of the Hérault department, southern France. Its borders were modified at the French canton reorganisation which came into effect in March 2015. Its seat is in Saint-Pons-de-Thomières.

Composition

It consists of the following communes:
 
Agel
Aigne
Aigues-Vives
Assignan
Azillanet
Babeau-Bouldoux
Beaufort
Berlou
Boisset
Cambon-et-Salvergues
Capestang
Cassagnoles
Castanet-le-Haut
La Caunette
Cazedarnes
Cébazan
Cessenon-sur-Orb
Cesseras
Colombières-sur-Orb
Courniou
Creissan
Cruzy
Félines-Minervois
Ferrals-les-Montagnes
Ferrières-Poussarou
Fraisse-sur-Agout
La Livinière
Minerve
Mons
Montels
Montouliers
Olargues
Olonzac
Oupia
Pardailhan
Pierrerue
Poilhes
Prades-sur-Vernazobre
Prémian
Puisserguier
Quarante
Rieussec
Riols
Roquebrun
Rosis
Saint-Chinian
Saint-Étienne-d'Albagnan
Saint-Jean-de-Minervois
Saint-Julien
Saint-Martin-de-l'Arçon
Saint-Pons-de-Thomières
Saint-Vincent-d'Olargues
La Salvetat-sur-Agout
Siran
Le Soulié
Vélieux
Verreries-de-Moussans
Vieussan
Villespassans

Councillors

Gallery

References

External links 
 Site of INSEE

Saint-Pons-de-Thomieres